The Greenville Derby Dames (GDD) is a women's flat track roller derby league based in Greenville, South Carolina. Founded in 2008, Greenville is a member of the Women's Flat Track Derby Association (WFTDA).

History and structure
Founded in November 2008, the league's skaters come from a wide variety of backgrounds. Greenville has competed in a number of tournaments, and hosts its own "'Twas the Fight before Christmas" tournament each December. The league consists of two teams, which compete against teams from other leagues.

The league was accepted as a member of the Women's Flat Track Derby Association Apprentice Program in July 2012, and became a full member of the WFTDA in June 2013.

WFTDA rankings

References

Sports in Greenville, South Carolina
Roller derby leagues established in 2008
Roller derby leagues in South Carolina
Women's Flat Track Derby Association Division 3
2008 establishments in South Carolina